Steven Feico Alle Bakker (born 13 April 1949 in Rotterdam) is a sailor from the Netherlands. Since the Netherlands did boycott the Moscow Olympic Games Bakker represented his National Olympic Committee at the 1980 Summer Olympics, which was boycotted by several countries, in Tallinn, USSR under the Dutch NOC flag. With his father Geert Bakker as helmsman and fellow crew member Dick Coster, Bakker took the 5th place in the Soling. In the 1988 Olympics in Pusan Bakker made his second Olympic appearance. This time as helmsman in the Dutch Star with Kobus Vandenberg as crew. They took 9th place.

Steven Bakker also represented The Netherlands during the 2008 Vintage Yachting Games in Medemblik as helmsman in the Soling with crewmembers Sven/ Dick Coster and Joost Houweling. The team took silver. At the 2012 Vintage Yachting Games at Lake Como Bakker helmed again the Soling now with crewmembers Robin Segaar and Casper van Drunen. The team finished 11th in the series.

Professional life
Bakker held several positions in the construction and real estate business. Nowadays he is director of Varese in the Netherlands.

Sources
 
 
 
 
 
 
 
 
 
 
 
 
 
 
 
 
 
 

Living people
1949 births
Sportspeople from 's-Hertogenbosch
Dutch male sailors (sport)

Sportspeople from Rotterdam
Sailors at the 1980 Summer Olympics – Soling
Sailors at the 1988 Summer Olympics – Star
Olympic sailors of the Netherlands
Sailors at the 2008 Vintage Yachting Games
Sailors at the 2012 Vintage Yachting Games
Soling class world champions
20th-century Dutch people
21st-century Dutch people